Grégoire Barrère was the defending champion and successfully defended his title.

Barrère won the title after defeating Yannick Maden 6–2, 4–6, 6–4 in the final.

Seeds
All seeds receive a bye into the second round.

Draw

Finals

Top half

Section 1

Section 2

Bottom half

Section 3

Section 4

References

External links
Main draw
Qualifying draw

Play In Challenger - Singles